Lisa Maxwell may refer to:

 Lisa Maxwell (actress) (born 1963), English actress and television presenter
 Lisa Maxwell (singer, songwriter), Australian singer and songwriter